According to the Book of Mormon, Zeezrom was an ancient American lawyer (one who is expert in the Hebrew Law, or the Law of Moses) who sought to destroy the liberty of the Nephites via his legal practice. He was converted to the gospel by Alma the Younger and his missionary companion Amulek.  (See .)

Summary of his life
Zeezrom lived in the land of Ammonihah, whose inhabitants were wicked.  Alma and Amulek tried to preach to the people of Ammonihah, but they were countered by Zeezrom.  Among other things Zeezrom tried to bribe Amulek and some scholars have argued that Zeezrom's name may be a dysphemism invoking money. Zeezrom tried to convince the people that Alma and Amulek were the wicked ones, but he was confounded and eventually was convinced of his misdeeds and repented of his sins.  He later left the practice of law and became missionary companions with Alma, Amulek, and others.

He then became a very active missionary in spreading the gospel of Jesus Christ. He taught the gospel in the land of Melek. He was also with Alma on his mission to the Zoramites. In later times he was held up as one of the key spreaders of the gospel of Jesus Christ along with Alma and Amulek.

References 

Book of Mormon people